Orion maurus is a species of beetle in the family Cerambycidae, the only species in the genus Orion.

References

Elaphidiini